Seaford is a town in East Sussex, England, east of Newhaven and west of Eastbourne.

In the Middle Ages, Seaford was one of the main ports serving Southern England, but the town's fortunes declined due to coastal sedimentation silting up its harbour and persistent raids by French pirates. The coastal confederation of Cinque Ports in the mediaeval period consisted of forty-two towns and villages; Seaford was included under the "Limb" of Hastings.
Between 1350 and 1550, the French burned down the town several times. In the 16th century, the people of Seaford were known as the "cormorants" or "shags" because of their enthusiasm for looting ships wrecked in the bay. Local legend has it that Seaford residents would, on occasion, cause ships to run aground by placing fake harbour lights on the cliffs.

Seaford's fortunes revived in the 19th century with the arrival of the railway connecting the town to Lewes and London. It became a small seaside resort town, and more recently a dormitory town for the nearby larger settlements of Eastbourne and Brighton, as well as for London.

The traditional Sussex pronunciation of the name has a full vowel in each syllable:  "sea-ford". However, outside Sussex, and increasingly within, it is commonly pronounced with a reduced vowel on the second syllable:  .

Geography

The town lies on the coast near Seaford Head, roughly equidistant between the mouths of the River Ouse and the Cuckmere. The Ouse valley was a wide tidal estuary with its mouth nearly closed by a shingle bar, but the tidal mudflats and salt marshes have been "inned" (protected from the tidal river by dykes) to form grassy freshwater marshes (grazing marsh). To the north the town faces the chalk downland of the South Downs, and along the coast to the east are the Seven Sisters chalk cliffs, and Beachy Head. This stretch of coast is notified for its geological and ecological features as Seaford to Beachy Head Site of Special Scientific Interest.

The River Ouse used to run parallel to the shore behind the shingle bar, entering the sea close to Seaford. However, a major storm in the 16th century broke through the bar at its western end, creating a new river mouth close to the village then called Meeching but renamed Newhaven. Part of the former channel of the river remains as a brackish lagoon.

The town formerly had excellent beaches, which were supplied by longshore drift constantly moving sand along the coast from west to east. However, in the early 20th century a large breakwater was constructed at Newhaven Harbour and the harbour entrance was regularly dredged. These works cut off the supply of fresh sand to the beach. By the 1980s the beach at Seaford had all but vanished, the shoreline becoming steep, narrow and largely composed of small boulders. This made Seaford attractive to watersports enthusiasts (since water visibility was good and there was a rapid drop-off into deep water) but it discouraged more general seaside visitors. So in 1987 a massive beach replenishment operation was carried out, in which around 1 million tonnes of material was dredged from sandbanks out to sea and deposited on the shore. During a severe storm that October a substantial amount of the deposited material on the upper part of the beach was washed out past low tide level, leading to questions in the House of Commons. The beach has been topped up several times since then, giving the town a broad beach of sand and shingle.

The town's publicity website states: For many, the main attraction in Seaford is the beach. This has an obvious attraction in the summer, when the sea reaches temperatures up to 20° Celsius (68 °F).

To the east of Seaford, below chalk cliffs, is a beach called Hope Gap. It is a location in the film Hope Gap.

History
In 1620 and 1624, the bailiff of Seaford was William Levett, of an Anglo-Norman family long seated in Sussex. William Levett of Seaford owned the Bunces and Stonehouse manors in Warbleton, probably inheriting them from his father John Levett, who died in 1607. Levett sold the estates in 1628 and died in 1635, his will being filed in Hastings.

The Levett family intermarried with other Sussex families, including the Gildredges, the Eversfields, the Popes, the Ashburnhams, the Adamses, and the Chaloners. A seal with his arms belonging to John de Livet, Lord of Firle, was found at Eastbourne in 1851.

Politics and administration
From 1894 to 1974 Seaford was an urban district run by Seaford Urban District Council. In the local government reorganisation of 1974 it became an unparished area which was part of the Lewes District Council area. This loss of independence was unpopular with Seaford residents and in 1999 the town became a civil parish within Lewes, with a town council. Municipal services within Seaford are now provided by three tiers of local government – the county council, the district council and the town council.

The town council has 20 members, four elected by each of five wards. The Seaford Community Partnership is a body incorporating representatives drawn from all three tiers of local government and from local civic groups. The partnership seeks to advise on long-term development strategy for the town. Currently the town council is composed of 10 Conservative, 7 Liberal Democrat and 1 Labour, 1 UKIP and 1 independent councillor.

In the Lewes District council elections on 7 May 2015 the town returned 7 Conservative district Councillors and 3 Liberal Democrat district Councillors. For District elections, the wards are the same five as for the Town council (Central, North, East, West, South) however they only return two Councillors to the District council.

The parliamentary constituency of Seaford was a notorious rotten borough until its disenfranchisement in the Reform Act 1832 when it was incorporated into the Lewes constituency. Seaford returned three members of parliament who went on to become Prime Minister: Henry Pelham represented the town from 1717 to 1722, William Pitt the Elder from 1747 to 1754 and George Canning in 1827.

Seaford is currently part of the Lewes parliamentary constituency. In the 2015 General election the constituency elected Maria Caulfield as MP, defeating the former Liberal Democrat MP Norman Baker by 1,083 votes. Caulfield was formerly an NHS nurse.

Seaford has been twinned with the town of Bönningstedt, Germany, since 1984. Seaford has one of the longest-serving town criers in England and Wales —Peter White— who was appointed to this honorary position in 1977 by Lewes District Council, and is now an appointee of Seaford Town Council. In 2012 he was also appointed Serjeant at Mace, and his historic uniform for both crying and mace-bearing is a replica of that worn by 19th. Century Serjeant William Woolgar. (in post 1865 – 1901) 

Seaford has the westernmost of the South Coast Martello Towers, number 74, now a local history museum.

Seaford lifeguards patrol the beach and water each weekend and bank holiday from May to September. They are made up of volunteers, mainly young people, who give thousands of unpaid hours every year to train and help keep the public safe. They have been recognised as the best equipped and trained non-RNLI beach lifeguard unit in the country.

Sport and leisure
Seaford Cricket Club have played at the Salts Recreation Ground since 1946, though the origins of cricket in Seaford go back to the 18th century. The latest augmentation of facilities was in 2010, when the pavilion was extended. Seaford Rugby Football Club, affiliated to the Sussex County Rugby Football Union, play at the same venue, which has the distinction of being below sea-level.

Seaford Town, the local football club, plays at the Crouch Playing Field. They play in the Sussex County League Division Two.

The town has two golf courses, Seaford Golf Club, a downland course at Firle Road, and Seaford Head Golf Course, from which the coastline and the South Downs can be seen.

Seaford has at least two bowling clubs. They include Seaford Bowling Club, which is a private club at Blatchington Road, dating back to 1912, and The Crouch Bowling Club in Crouch Gardens, East Street.

Downs Leisure Centre operates 'The Wave' in Seaford. The Wave is a leisure centre offering a range of sports and pastimes, including badminton, indoor bowls, children's disco dancing, line-dancing and fitness classes. It should not be confused with WAVES, which is a Seaford-based charity supporting families in difficulties.

Swimming facilities are provided for the town at Seaford Head Swimming Pool, which is also run by Wave Leisure.

Towards the western end of Seaford Bay lies Newhaven and Seaford Sailing Club. Founded in 1952 by a group of sailing enthusiasts, the club now has two sites – racing off Seaford Beach and sailing at Piddinghoe Lake near Newhaven where the RYA accredited Sailing School is located.

The area around Seaford, such as up the Cuckmere Valley and along the South Downs Way, offers many walking routes.

Transport
Two local half-hourly circular bus services, the 119 and 120, are provided by Cuckmere Buses (Monday-Friday) and Compass Bus on Saturdays, who also run bus 126 from Seaford via Alfriston to Eastbourne.

Brighton & Hove operate two frequent bus services, the 12 and 12A (up to every 10 minutes), routed along the A259 south coast road through Seaford (the 12A goes via the Chyngton Estate on the east side of Seaford) which take passengers to Brighton or Eastbourne which both have extensive onward bus services.

Seaford station is the terminus of the line from Brighton via Lewes and Newhaven. The local train services are operated by Southern.

Notable people

 Sir Anthony Blunt, the former keeper of the Queen's paintings who was revealed to be a Soviet spy, went to school in Seaford.
 Actor Tony Caunter, who played Roy Evans in the BBC soap opera EastEnders, once lived in Seaford.
 Clementine Churchill, wife of British prime minister Winston Churchill, lived in Seaford.
 Actor Nigel Davenport, attended St Peter's School, Seaford.
 Actor Maurice Denham lived in Seaford.
 Paul Garred, drummer of the band The Kooks, grew up in Seaford. 
 Comedian Dickie Henderson went to school in Seaford.
  Musician Robyn Hitchcock spent time in Seaford, writing about it in his song "Museum of Sex".
 Chess player David Howell, the UK's youngest grandmaster and British champion, grew up in Seaford.
 Jordan, an actor/model noted for her work with Vivienne Westwood and the Sex boutique in the King's Road area of London in the mid-1970s, was born in Seaford, and worked in the town as a veterinary nurse.
 Actor Dame Penelope Keith went to school in Seaford.
 Former motorcycling stunt rider Eddie Kidd now lives in Seaford.
 Saint Lewine, an early British martyr: her relics were translated to Seaford in 1058 AD.
 Actor Oscar Lloyd, who appears in ITV soap Emmerdale, was born in Seaford.
 Val McCalla, who was voted in 1997 as one of the top 100 black Britons of all time and was the founder of The Voice, lived in Seaford until his death in 2002.
 Michael Olowokandi, from Nigeria, former NBA basketball player for the Minnesota Timberwolves and most recently the Boston Celtics 2006–2007, went to school for a short time at Newlands Manor School, Seaford.
 Don Partridge, singer-songwriter, lived in Seaford.
 Twin sisters Connie Powney and Cassie Powney, who played Mel and Sophie Burton in Channel 4 soap Hollyoaks, grew up in Seaford.
 Actress Margaret Rutherford went to school in Seaford.
 The astronaut Piers Sellers attended Tyttenhanger Lodge Preparatory School, Seaford.
 Woodcut artist Eric Slater lived and died in Seaford, and is buried there.
 Bruce Stewart, writer of the 1970, ITV series Timeslip, lived in Seaford.
 Pete Thomas, drummer with a 30-year association with Elvis Costello, was brought up in Seaford.
 Tennessee Thomas, drummer of The Like and fashion model, lived in Seaford before moving to California.
 Colin Wells, ex-professional cricketer for Sussex and Derbyshire, lives in Seaford.
 Grace Robertson OBE, photographer for Picture Post lived in Seaford with her husband Thurston Hopkins, also a photojournalist, from the 1980s up until her death at age 90 in 2021.

Education

Between the late 19th century and the 1950s, Seaford was renowned as a "school town". The many preparatory schools and other independent schools were the main employers in the town. In the 1960s, Sutton Avenue had a road sign warning "7 schools in next mile". Sunday mornings in term-time were marked by "crocodiles" of schoolchildren from each of the preparatory schools walking to church for the special schools' service.

Most of these independent schools, such as Ladycross School and St Peter's School were closed and the land used for new housing estates in the last decades of the 20th century. The last girls' school, Micklefield, closed in 1994.

Although it has many primary schools (Chyngton, Cradle Hill, Annecy, Seaford County Primary), from the nursery to the "sixth year" of education, the town of Seaford has only one state-run secondary school, Seaford Head School, which in 2009 closed its sixth form, but re-opened it in 2014. Seaford was also home to an independent school, Newlands Preparatory and Manor, which included a specialist unit for pupils with specific learning difficulties. However, the school closed for good in July 2014. Its previous site is currently being redeveloped into a housing estate.

The town is also home to a special needs boarding school called Bowden House which is run by Tower Hamlets Council.

Places of worship

Parts of the nave, aisles and clerestory of the Church of England parish church of St Leonard are Norman work from the 11th century. The north and south arcades and most of the clerestory windows are Early English Gothic. The tower is 14th century and its upper part is Perpendicular Gothic. The transepts and polygonal apse are Gothic Revival additions designed by John Billing and built in 1861–82. There is some modern stained glass by the Cox & Barnard firm of Hove. The church is a Grade I listed building. St Luke's Church, opened in 1959 and built of flint and brick, serves the Chyngton and Sutton suburbs of the town.  It has been attributed to architect John Leopold Denman.

The Roman Catholic Church of St Thomas More was built in 1935 to replace a chapel in the grounds of Bishop of Southwark Francis Bourne's home nearby.  James O'Hanlon Hughes and Geoffrey Welch designed the flint and render building, which was extended in 1969 using artificial stone.

W.F. Poulton designed a Gothic Revival chapel for Congregationalists in 1877.  The flint building has a distinctive corner turret. It is now a United Reformed church with the name Cross Way Clinton Centre, and has links with the town's Methodist church, now called Cross Way Church.  This was built in the Gothic Revival style of red brick in 1894. A town-centre Baptist chapel was demolished in 1973 and replaced by a new brown-brick circular church on the road to East Blatchington. Elsewhere in the town, there is a Jehovah's Witnesses Kingdom Hall, a Spiritualist church and an Evangelical church (the Seaford Community Church in Vale Road).

Military 

The Romans are known to have had a camp in Seaford. From 1794 coastal defence barracks were established at East
Blatchington. In 1806–1808 a Martello Tower was built at the eastern end of Seaford Bay. It is the most westerly of the towers, numbered tower 74.

During the First and Second World Wars there were large military camps in the town. In the First World War, the camps were built to house the 22nd Division from Kitchener's Third New Army. The south camp nearly encircled Seaford ladies college. In December 1914 there was a strike by a mainly Welsh regiment over the remoteness of the accommodation and mud. In 1919 two thousand Canadians rioted after one of them was beaten by a camp picket for walking with his hands in his pockets.

Seaford has seven Victoria Cross holders associated with the town:
 William George Walker lived and died in Seaford
 Cuthbert Bromley lived in Seaford
 William Frederick McFadzean trained at the North Camp, Seaford
 Geoffrey Charles Tasker Keyes attended King's Mead School, Seaford
 David Auldjo Jamieson attended Ladycross School, Seaford
 Claud Raymond lived in Seaford
 H. Jones attended St Peter's School, Seaford

Twin towns
  Bönningstedt, Germany
  Crivitz, Germany

Freedom of the Town
The following people and military units have received the Freedom of the Town of Seaford.

Individuals
 Field Marshal His Grace The Duke of Richmond : 1789.
 Rt Hon William Pitt: 1789.
 Neil Moffett: 1980. 
 Laurie Holland: 30 September 2012.
 Donald Mabey : 30 September 2012.
 Keith Blackburn: February 2019.

Military Units
 210 (Sussex) Field Squadron, RE (TA): 1959.

See also 
 Seaford Museum
 Seaford Head Nature Reserve
 Seaford railway station, East Sussex
 Bishopstone
 Bishopstone railway station
 Tide Mills, East Sussex
 East Blatchington
 Alfriston
 Seahaven FM 96.3 Ofcom licensed Community Radio Station based in Seaford
 St. Leonard's & St. Luke's Churches

References

External links

Seaford Town Council

 
Towns in East Sussex
Civil parishes in East Sussex
Populated coastal places in East Sussex
Seaside resorts in England
Beaches of East Sussex